Zorba the Greek (Alexis Zorbas) is a 1964 comedy-drama film written, produced, edited, and directed by Greek Cypriot filmmaker Michael Cacoyannis. It stars Anthony Quinn as Zorba, an earthy and boisterous Cretan peasant, and Alan Bates as the buttoned-up young intellectual he befriends. The cast also includes Lila Kedrova, Irene Papas, and Sotiris Moustakas. The musical score was composed by Mikis Theodorakis. The film is based on the 1946 novel The Life And Times Of Alexis Zorba by Nikos Kazantzakis.

Produced in Greece for under $1 million, Zorba was a considerable critical and commercial success, grossing over nine times its production budget at the U.S. box office alone. At the 37th Academy Awards, the film won awards for Best Supporting Actress (Kedrova), Best Cinematography and Best Art Direction. Other nominations included Best Picture, Best Director, and Best Actor for Anthony Quinn, whose performance has been cited as one of the most iconic in film history, and which spawned the folkdance known as the sirtaki. The film and its source novel were later adapted into a Tony-winning stage musical, which Cacoyannis, Quinn, and Kedrova all participated in.

Cast
 Anthony Quinn as Alexis Zorba, a fictionalized version of the mine worker George Zorbas ( 1867–1942)
 Alan Bates as Basil
 Irene Papas as the Widow
 Lila Kedrova as Madame Hortense
 Sotiris Moustakas as Mimithos
 Anna Kyriakou as Soul
 Eleni Anousaki as Lola
 George Voyadjis as Pavlo
 Takis Emmanuel as Manolakas
 George Foundas as Mavrandoni
 Pia Lindström (deleted scenes) as Peasant girl

Plot
Basil is a Greek-British writer raised in the UK who bears the hallmarks of an uptight, middle-class Englishman. He is waiting at the Athens port of Piraeus on mainland Greece to catch a boat to Crete when he meets a gruff, yet enthusiastic Greek-Macedonian peasant and musician named Zorba. Basil explains to Zorba that he is traveling to a rural Cretan village where his father owns some land, with the intention of reopening a Lignite mine and perhaps curing his writer's block. Zorba relates his experience with mining and persuades Basil to take him along.

When they arrive at Crete, they take a car to the village where they are greeted enthusiastically by the town's impoverished peasant community. They stay with an old French former courtesan named Madame Hortense in her self-styled "Hotel Ritz". The audacious Zorba tries to persuade Basil into making a move on Madame Hortense, but when he is reluctant, Zorba seizes the opportunity, and they form a relationship.

Over the next few days, Basil and Zorba attempt to work the old lignite mine, but find it unsafe and shut it down.  Zorba then has an idea to use the forest in the nearby mountains for logging, (his specific plan is left ambiguous, but it seems he thinks the timber can be used to shore up the tunnels). The land is owned by a monastery, so Zorba visits and befriends the monks, getting them drunk. Afterwards, he comes home to Basil and begins to dance in a way that mesmerizes Basil.

Meanwhile, Basil and Zorba get their first introduction to "the Widow", a young and attractive widowed woman, who is teased incessantly by the townspeople for not remarrying, especially to a young local boy who is madly in love with her, but whom she has spurned repeatedly. One rainy afternoon, Basil offers her his umbrella, which she reluctantly takes. Zorba suggests that she is attracted to him, but Basil, ever shy, denies this and refuses to pursue the widow.

Basil hands Zorba some money, and sends him off to the large town of Chania, where Zorba is to buy cable and other supplies for the implementation of his grand plan. Zorba says goodbye to Basil and Madame Hortense, who is by now madly in love with him. In Chania, Zorba entertains himself at a cabaret and has a brief romance with a much younger dancer. In a letter to Basil, he details his exploits and indicates that he has found love. Angered by Zorba's apparent irresponsibility and the squandering of his money, Basil untruthfully tells Madame Hortense that Zorba has declared his love to her and intends to marry her upon his return, which makes her ecstatic to the point of tears. Meanwhile, the Widow returns Basil's umbrella by way of Mimithos, the village idiot.

When Zorba eventually returns with supplies and gifts, he is surprised and angered to hear of Basil's lie to Madame Hortense. He also asks Basil about his whereabouts the night before. That night, Basil had gone to the Widow's house and spent the night. The brief encounter comes at great cost. A villager catches sight of them, and word spreads, and the young local boy who is in love with the Widow is told about it. The next morning, the villagers find his body by the sea, where he has drowned himself out of shame.

The boy's father, Mavrandoni, holds a funeral which the villagers attend. The widow attempts to come inconspicuously, but is blocked from entering the church. She is eventually trapped in the courtyard, then beaten and stoned by the villagers, who hold her responsible for the boy's suicide. Basil tells Mimithos to fetch Zorba. Zorba arrives just as a villager, a friend of the boy, tries to kill the widow with a knife. Zorba overpowers the much younger man and disarms him. Thinking that the situation is under control, Zorba asks the Widow to follow him and turns his back. At that moment, the dead boy's father pulls his knife and cuts the widow's throat. She dies at once, as the villagers shuffle away apathetically, whisking the father away. Only Basil, Zorba and Mimithos show any emotion over her murder. Basil proclaims his inability to intervene whereupon Zorba laments the futility of death.

On a rainy day, Basil and Zorba come home and find Madame Hortense waiting. She expresses anger at Zorba for making no progress on the wedding. Zorba conjures up a story that he had ordered a white satin wedding dress, lined with pearls and adorned with real gold. Madame Hortense presents two golden rings she had made and proposes their immediate engagement. Zorba tries to stall, but eventually agrees with gusto, to Basil's surprise.

Some time later, Madame Hortense has contracted pneumonia, and is seen on her deathbed. Zorba stays by her side, along with Basil. Meanwhile, word has spread that "the foreigner" is dying, and since she has no heirs, the State will take her possessions and money. The poor villagers crowd around her hotel, impatiently waiting for her demise so they can steal her belongings. As two old ladies enter her room and gaze expectantly at her, other women try to enter, but Zorba manages to fight them off. At the instant of her death, the women re-enter Madame Hortense's bedroom en masse to steal her valued possessions. Zorba leaves with a sigh, as the hotel is ransacked and stripped bare by the shrieking and excited villagers. When Zorba returns to Madame Hortense's bedroom, the room is barren apart from her bed (where she lies) and the parrot in her cage. Zorba takes the birdcage with him.

Finally, Zorba's elaborate contraption to transport timber down the hill is complete. A festive ceremony, including lamb on a spit, is held, and all the villagers turn out. After a blessing from the priests, Zorba signals the start by firing a rifle in the air. A log comes hurtling down the zip line at a worrying pace, destroying the log itself and slightly damaging part of the contraption. Zorba remains unconcerned and gives orders for a second log. This one also speeds down and shoots straight into the sea. By now the villagers and priests have grown fearful and head for cover. Zorba remains unfazed and orders a third log, which accelerates downhill with such violence that it dislodges the entire contraption, destroying everything. The villagers flee, leaving Basil and Zorba behind.

Basil and Zorba sit by the shore to eat roasted lamb. Zorba pretends to tell the future from the lamb shank, saying that he foresees a great journey to a big city. He then asks Basil directly when he plans to leave, and Basil replies that he will leave in a few days. Zorba declares his sadness about Basil's imminent departure to England and tells Basil that he is missing madness. Basil asks Zorba to teach him to dance. Zorba teaches him the sirtaki and Basil begins to laugh hysterically at the catastrophic outcome. The story ends with both men enthusiastically dancing the sirtaki on the beach.

Production
The film was shot in black and white on location on the Greek island of Crete. Specific locations featured include the city of Chania, the village of Kokkino Chorio in the Apokoronas region and Stavros beach in the Akrotiri peninsula. The scene in which Quinn's character dances the Sirtaki was filmed on the beach of the village of Stavros.

Simone Signoret began filming the role of Madame Hortense; Lila Kedrova replaced her early in the production.

Reception

Box office
The film was a smash hit. Produced on a budget of only $783,000, it grossed $9 million at the U.S. box office, earning $4.4 million in U.S. theatrical rentals. At the worldwide box office, the film earned $9.4 million in rentals, placing the worldwide gross between $18.8 million to $23.5 million. It was the 17th highest-grossing film of 1964.

According to Fox records, the film needed to earn $3,000,000 in rentals to break even and made $9,400,000. By September 1970 it earned the studio an estimated profit of $2,565,000.

Critical response
The film has an 86% rating at Rotten Tomatoes. On both sides of the Atlantic, Zorba was applauded and Quinn came in for the best reviews. He was lauded as Zorba, along with the other stars, including Greek-born Papas, who worked with Quinn on The Guns of Navarone.

Contemporary reviews were generally positive, with Anthony Quinn and Lila Kedrova receiving numerous accolades for their performances, although a few critics found fault with the screenplay. Bosley Crowther of The New York Times lauded Quinn for a "brilliant performance" and Kedrova for her "brilliantly realized" character, citing the only real weakness of the film as a lack of "significant conflict to prove its dominant character. Zorba is powerful and provocative, but nobody gets in his way." Margaret Harford of the Los Angeles Times declared that the film would "stand among the year's best motion pictures, an unusual, engrossing effort" with spots both "outrageously funny" and "painfully sad and tragic."

Richard L. Coe of The Washington Post deemed it "a memorable picture" with a "bravura performance" from Quinn, adding that "Lila Kedrova as the dying Mme Hortense is spectacularly touching." Variety found the film excessively long and overstuffed, writing that Cacoyannis's screenplay was "packed with incidents of varying moods, so packed, in fact, that some of the more important ones cannot be developed fully." Brendan Gill of The New Yorker wrote that Cacoyannis had directed the film with "enormous verve" but had written a "not very tidy, not very plausible screenplay." Gill particularly praised Kedrova's performance and thought that she "comes within an ace of stealing the picture from Quinn." The Monthly Film Bulletin wrote that the film began well, but by the time the characters went to Crete "the pace slows to a crawl, and the narrative line becomes blurred in a series of unrelated incidents of doubtful significance." The review concluded that for all its length, "the film never gets down to a clear statement of its theme, or comes within measuring distance of its vast pretensions."

Awards and nominations 

The film is recognized by American Film Institute in these lists:
 2006: AFI's 100 Years...100 Cheers – Nominated

Preservation
The Academy Film Archive preserved Zorba the Greek in 2004.

In popular culture
In a January 15, 1968 Peanuts comic strip, Snoopy is happily dancing atop of his doghouse with Lucy looking on until the final panel where she comments: "Zorba the Greek, you aren't!".

See also

 "Zorbas", the theme song of the film by Greek composer Mikis Theodorakis
 Zorba (musical), a musical based on the book

References

External links
 
 
 
 
 

1964 films
1960s English-language films
English-language Greek films
1960s Greek-language films
1964 comedy-drama films
British black-and-white films
British comedy-drama films
Greek black-and-white films
Greek comedy-drama films
Greek multilingual films
British multilingual films
Adaptations of works by Nikos Kazantzakis
Films about writers
Films based on Greek novels
Films directed by Michael Cacoyannis
Films featuring a Best Supporting Actress Academy Award-winning performance
Films set in Crete
Films set in Greece
Films set on beaches
Films shot in Greece
Films shot in Crete
Films whose art director won the Best Art Direction Academy Award
Films whose cinematographer won the Best Cinematography Academy Award
1964 in Greece
20th Century Fox films
Films scored by Mikis Theodorakis
1964 comedy films
1964 drama films
1960s British films